The 2008 LPGA Tour was a series of weekly golf tournaments for elite female golfers from around the world that took place from February through December 2008. The tournaments were sanctioned by the United States-based Ladies Professional Golf Association (LPGA). In 2008, prize money on the LPGA Tour was $60.3 million, which was the highest in the history of the tour until 2016.

Lorena Ochoa topped the money list, earning $2,763,193. Ochoa also led the league in most wins with six, including four consecutive tournaments in March and April and one major tournament.

The four major championships were won by: Lorena Ochoa (Kraft Nabisco Championship), Yani Tseng (LPGA Championship), Inbee Park (U.S. Women's Open), and Jiyai Shin (Women's British Open).  All major winners except Ochoa were not only first-time major winners, but first-time winners on the LPGA Tour. Tseng, at 19 years old, and Park and Shin, both at 20 years old, became the youngest-ever winners of the respective majors.

On May 12, a day after winning her third tournament of the season, Annika Sörenstam announced her intent to "step away" from competitive golf at the end of the 2008 season. She continued to draw large crowds through the remainder of the season, though she did not win another tournament on the LPGA Tour before the end of the year.

Jiyai Shin, a 20-year-old non-LPGA member, set records on the LPGA Tour by winning three of the nine tournaments in which she played, including the Women's British Open and the season-ending ADT Championship with its $1 million first place prize. She became the first non-LPGA member ever to win three events.

The LPGA organization also attracted attention in 2008 when commissioner Carolyn Bivens announced a new policy in August that would have required all players who had been on the tour for two years to show proficiency in English or face suspension. The Tour rescinded the policy two weeks later after increasing criticism from the media and from LPGA Tour sponsors.

Tournament schedule and results
ADT Playoff Categories:
 winner: Official LPGA Tour events with a purse of at least $2,000,000. Winners of these events automatically qualify for the ADT Championship.
 standard: Winners do not automatically qualify for the ADT Championship; the ADT points system is used.
 unofficial: These events are not official LPGA Tour events and participation is not part of the ADT Playoff system.

The number in parentheses after winners' names show the player's total number of official money, individual event wins on the LPGA Tour, including that event.

Tournaments in bold are majors.
**The Wendy's 3-Tour Challenge was held on November 17. It was broadcast on television on December 13 and 14. The official LPGA Tour schedule lists the tournament dates based on the date of the television broadcast.
*Shin was not an LPGA member in 2008.

Leaders
Money List leaders

Full 2008 Official Money List - navigate to "2008"

Scoring Average leaders

Full 2008 Scoring Average List - navigate to "2008", then "Scoring Average"

Award winners
The three competitive awards given out by the LPGA each year are:
The Rolex Player of the Year is awarded based on a formula in which points are awarded for top-10 finishes and are doubled at the LPGA's four major championships and at the season-ending ADT Championship. The points system is: 30 points for first; 12 points for second; nine points for third; seven points for fourth; six points for fifth; five points for sixth; four points for seventh; three points for eighth; two points for ninth and one point for 10th.
2008 Winner:  Lorena Ochoa. Runner-up:  Paula Creamer
The Vare Trophy, named for Glenna Collett-Vare, is given to the player with the lowest scoring average for the season.
2008 Winner:  Lorena Ochoa. Runner-up:  Annika Sörenstam
The Louis Suggs Rolex Rookie of the Year Award is awarded to the first-year player on the LPGA Tour who scores the highest in a points competition in which points are awarded at all full-field domestic events and doubled at the LPGA's four major championships. The points system is: 150 points for first; 80 points for second; 75 points for third; 70 points for fourth; and 65 points for fifth. After fifth place, points are awarded in increments of three, beginning at sixth place with 62 points. Rookies who make the cut in an event and finish below 41st each receive five points.  The award is named after Louise Suggs, one of the founders of the LPGA.
2008 Winner:  Yani Tseng. Runner-up:  Na Yeon Choi

See also
2008 in golf
2008 Duramed Futures Tour
2008 Ladies European Tour

References 

LPGA Tour seasons
LPGA Tour